"Praise You In This Storm" is a song recorded by contemporary Christian music band Casting Crowns, released by Beach Street and Reunion Records. Written by Mark Hall and Bernie Herms and produced by Mark A. Miller, it was released on January 28, 2006 as the second radio single from the band's 2005 album Lifesong. Inspired by the band's experience with a girl, Erin Browning, who died of cancer, the song has the lyrical theme of maintaining faith through difficult circumstances. A power ballad, "Praise You In This Storm" incorporates a wall of sound dynamic into its alternative CCM and adult alternative sound.

"Praise You In This Storm" received positive reviews from music critics, who praised the song's sound and lyrical theme. It was nominated for two awards at the 38th GMA Dove Awards, winning the award for Pop/Contemporary Recorded Song of the Year. It peaked at number one on the Billboard Hot Christian Songs and Hot Christian AC charts and also topped the Radio & Records Christian AC and Soft AC/Inspirational charts. It has been certified Platinum by the Recording Industry Association of America (RIAA), signifying sales of over 1,000,000 digital downloads in the United States. It was included on WOW Hits 2008.

Background and recording
Lead vocalist Mark Hall says that "Praise You In This Storm" was inspired by the band's experience with a young girl, Erin Browning. The band made arrangements to meet Erin, who had performed a dance at her public school to one of the band's songs, and her family on Valentine's Day 2004 before one of their concerts. Right around the time the band connected with Erin and her family was when she was found to have cancer. Erin died on November 1, 2004. According to Hall, "Watching [Erin's mother] walk through this really showed me truth about my worship. Watching her walk through a real storm showed me that my worship was extremely situational". Hall began writing the song before Erin's death and told her about it, but was not able to complete it before she died.

"Praise You In This Storm" was written by Mark Hall and Bernie Herms. It was produced by Mark A. Miller, with recording and mixing done by Sam Hewitt at Zoo Studio in Franklin, Tennessee. Additional recording was done at Lifesong Studio in McDonough, Georgia. It was mastered by Richard Dodd and engineered by Dale Oliver and John Lewis Lee III. The strings on "Praise You In This Storm" were arranged by Bobby Huff and were recorded at Little Big Studio by Boeho Shin and Daewoo Kim.

Composition

"Praise You In This Storm" is a song with a length of four minutes and 57 seconds. According to the sheet music published by Musicnotes.com, it is set in common time in the key of G minor and has a tempo of 84 beats per minute. Mark Hall's vocal range in the song spans from the low note of B3 to the high note of E5. A power ballad, "Praise You In This Storm" is an alternative CCM and adult alternative song. It utilizes a wall of sound dynamic and its lyrical theme, "maintaining faith through difficult circumstances", has been compared to that of the biblical character Job.

Critical reception and accolades
"Praise You In This Storm" received positive reviews from music critics following the release of Lifesong. Russ Breimeier of Christianity Today said "it's vertical in focus and a typical-sounding power ballad, but it's not hard to imagine people latching on to its powerful Job-like expression of faith and hope.". John DiBiase of Jesus Freak Hideout praised it as "sonic" and called it a "passionate and emotional worship experience". Brian Mansfield of USA Today felt that the song's lyric "I was sure by now that You would have reached down and wiped our tears away/Stepped in and saved the day/But once again, I say 'Amen,' and it's still raining" would resonate with listeners.

"Praise You In This Storm" won the award for Pop/Contemporary Recorded Song of the Year at the 38th GMA Dove Awards; it was also nominated for Song of the Year at that same event. At the 39th GMA Dove Awards, "Praise You In This Storm" was nominated for Worship Song of the Year.

Release and chart performance
"Praise You In This Storm" was included as the second track on Casting Crowns' album Lifesong, which was released on August 30, 2005. It was later released as a single to Christian AC, Christian CHR, and Soft AC/Inspirational radio on January 28, 2006. It debuted at number 25 on the Billboard Hot Christian Songs chart for the chart week of February 18, 2006. It advanced to number 19 in its second chart week and to number 10 in its sixth week. It entered the top five in its eighth chart week, moving to number three, and advanced to number two in its 12th chart week. In its fifteenth chart week, "Praise You In This Storm" hit the number one position; it held that spot for a total of seven consecutive weeks. In total, "Praise You In This Storm" spent a total of 40 weeks on the Hot Christian Songs chart. It also peaked at number one on the Billboard Hot Christian AC chart and the Radio & Records Christian AC and Soft AC/Inspirational charts. On the Radio & Records Christian CHR chart, "Praise You In This Storm" peaked at number three.

"Praise You In This Storm" ranked at number two on the 2006 year-end Billboard Hot Christian Songs and Hot Christian AC charts. It also ranked at number two on the 2006 year-end Radio & Records Christian AC and Soft AC/Inspirational charts and number five on the 2006 year-end Radio & Records Christian CHR chart. It ranked at number 11 on the 2000s decade-end Hot Christian AC chart and at number 13 on the 2000s decade-end Hot Christian Songs chart. The song was certified Gold by the Recording Industry Association of America (RIAA) on September 26, 2011, signifying sales of over 500,000 digital downloads in the United States, and was certified Platinum on November 13, 2015, certifying sales of over 1,000,000 digital downloads in the United States.

Live performances
Since the release of Lifesong, Casting Crowns has performed "Praise You In This Storm" in concert. At a concert on November 12, 2005 at Stabler Arena in Bethlehem, Pennsylvania, Casting Crowns performed the song as the fifth one on their set list. The performed it at a concert on March 22, 2008 at Jacksonville Veterans Memorial Arena in Jacksonville, Florida and at a concert on February 3, 2010 at the Sprint Center in Kansas City, Missouri. On February 28, 2010 in Hershey, Pennsylvania, they performed it as the fourth-to-last song of the concert. Casting Crowns performed "Praise You In This Storm" in concert on February 16, 2012 at the Van Andel Arena in Grand Rapids, Michigan and on March 8, 2012 at the Freedom Hall in Johnson City, Tennessee.

Track listing
Digital download
"Praise You In This Storm" – 4:57

Credits and personnel
Credits adapted from the album liner notes of Lifesong.

Casting Crowns
Hector Cervantes – Electric guitar
Juan DeVevo – Electric guitar, acoustic guitar
Melodee DeVevo – Violin
Hector Cervantes – Piano, keyboard
Mark Hall – Vocals
Chris Huffman – Bass guitar
Andy Williams – Drums

Additional musicians
David Angell - Violin
Monisa Angell - Violin
David Davidson - Contractor, concertmaster
Jack Jezioro - Bass
Anthony Lamarchina - Cello
Sarighani Reist - Cello
Pamela Sixfin - Violin
Mary Vanosdale - Violin
Kristin Wilkinson - Viola

Production
Richard Dodd - Mastering
Terry Hemmings - Executive producer
Sam Hewitt - Recording, mixing
Bobby Huff - String arrangement
Daewoo Kim - Recording (strings)
John Lewis Lee III - Engineering
Jason McArthur - A&R Coordination
Dale Oliver - Engineering
Mark A. Miller - Producer
Boeho "Bobby" Shin - Recording (strings)

Charts

Certifications

Release and radio history

Natalie Grant cover version

Natalie Grant covered the song on her tenth studio album "No Stranger". It was released on June 12, 2020 as the first promotional single from the aforementioned album.

Background
“I’ve loved this song since 2005 when my husband wrote it with Mark Hall. It became new to me in 2017 when I walked through the storm of cancer. Now, as the whole world finds itself in a storm, it’s new to me all over again.”

Commercial performance
It peaked at No. 31 and No. 4 on Billboard's Hot Christian Songs and  Christian Digital Songs respectively.

Charts

References

2006 singles
Songs written by Mark Hall (musician)
Casting Crowns songs
Songs written by Bernie Herms
2000s ballads